The 1993 Nichirei International was a women's tennis tournament played on outdoor hard courts at the Ariake Coliseum in Tokyo, Japan that was part of Tier II of the 1993 WTA Tour. It was the fourth edition of the tournament and was held from 21 September through 26 September 1993. Fourth-seeded Amanda Coetzer won the singles title and earned $75,000 first-prize money.

Finals

Singles

 Amanda Coetzer defeated  Kimiko Date 6–3, 6–2
 It was Coetzer's 2nd singles title of the year and of her career.

Doubles

 Lisa Raymond /  Chanda Rubin defeated  Amanda Coetzer /  Linda Harvey-Wild 6–4, 6–1

References

External links
 ITF tournament edition details
 Tournament draws

Nichirei International Championships
Nichirei International Championships
1993 in Japanese tennis
1993 in Japanese women's sport